Kulung (also known as Kode, Koode, Kwoode, Pia, Pitiko, Widala, Wurkum) is an Afro-Asiatic language spoken in Nigeria.

Notes 

West Chadic languages
Languages of Nigeria